"Flowers on the Wall" is a song made famous by American country music group The Statler Brothers. Written and composed by Lew DeWitt, the group's original tenor vocalist, the song peaked in popularity in January 1966, spending four weeks at number two on the Billboard magazine Hot Country Singles chart, and reaching number four on the Billboard Hot 100 chart.

The song won the 1966 Grammy Award for Best Contemporary (R&R) Performance - Group (Vocal or Instrumental).

The Statler Brothers re-recorded the song in 1975 for their first greatest-hits album for Mercury Records, The Best of The Statler Brothers. The song is also featured on Nancy Sinatra's album Boots (1966).

Chart performance

Eric Heatherly version

Eric Heatherly recorded the song in 2000 on his debut album, Swimming In Champagne. Also released as his debut single, Heatherly's rendition reached number six on the Hot Country Songs charts and number 50 on the Billboard Hot 100.

Chart history

Year-end charts

In popular culture
 The song (its 1975 version) is used in the soundtrack to the 1994  film Pulp Fiction. In the film, Bruce Willis's character sings along to the line, "smoking cigarettes and watching Captain Kangaroo" as he is driving. In the 1995 film Die Hard with a Vengeance, when Willis' character John McClane is describing his suspension from the police force, he says he was "smoking cigarettes and watching Captain Kangaroo."
 The song was frequently employed as bumper music on the syndicated radio talk show Coast to Coast AM, particularly in the earlier days when Art Bell was the host.
 Kurt Vonnegut quotes the song's complete lyrics in his 1981 book Palm Sunday, calling the song "yet another great contemporary poem by the Statler Brothers" and using it to describe "the present condition" of an American man who had recently departed his family. "It is not a poem of escape or rebirth. It is a poem about the end of a man's usefulness", he adds.
 In a video by The Muppets, a band of rats, The Ratler Brothers, sing the song while Beaker struggles with insomnia after being the subject of an experiment that involved consuming a large amount of coffee. The line in the chorus "smoking cigarettes and watching Captain Kangaroo" is changed to be about other activities.
 Nancy Sinatra covered the song for her album Boots.
  Jean Shepard covered the song for her 1975 album Jean Shepard and the Second Fiddles
  An instrumental version of the song was used in the New Zealand TV programme A Dog's Show.
 It is the theme song of the radio series Linda Smith's A Brief History of Timewasting.
Home Free covered the song in May 2020 to pay tribute to Harold Reid, who had passed away earlier that year in April.

References

Further reading
 Whitburn, Joel, Top Country Songs: 1944-2005 (2006)

External links
Both the 1966 and 1975 versions on YouTube

1965 singles
2000 debut singles
The Statler Brothers songs
Eric Heatherly songs
Songs about loneliness
Songs about flowers
Song recordings produced by Keith Stegall
RPM Top Singles number-one singles
Columbia Records singles
Mercury Records singles
Songs written by Lew DeWitt
1965 songs
Song recordings produced by Don Law